The 1982/83 NTFL season was the 62nd season of the Northern Territory Football League (NTFL).

The Wanderers Eagles have won their ninth premiership title while defeating St Marys in the grand final by 11 points.

Grand Final

References

Northern Territory Football League seasons
NTFL